The first cycle of Holland's Next Top Model premiered on 4 September 2006 on RTL5. Model Yfke Sturm served as the show's first host, with a panel consisting of Dutch photographer and director Carli Hermès, journalist and editor Karin Swerink, and presenter Rosalie van Breemen. Makeup artist Dominique Samuel and creative director Ruud van der Peijl also served minor roles throughout this first cycle.

The prizes for this cycle included a modelling contract with Max Models valued at €50,000, a cover feature for Glamour magazine, and the opportunity to represent the Netherlands at the 2007 Ford Models Supermodel of the World contest.

The winner of the competition was 19-year-old Sanne Nijhof from Den Ham, Overijssel. Nijhof went on to win the Ford Models Supermodel of the World contest the year following her victory in Holland's Next Top Model, winning an additional US$250,000 contract with Ford Models.

Cast

Contestants
(Ages stated are at start of contest)

Judges
Yfke Sturm (host)
Rosalie van Breemen
 Carli Hermès
Karin Swerink

Other cast members
Ruud van der Peijl
Dominique Samuel
Mariana Verkerk

Episodes

Results

 The contestant was eliminated
 The contestant was put through collectively to the next round
 The contestant won the competition

Notes

References

Holland's Next Top Model
2006 Dutch television seasons